The ABC Under-18 Championship for Women 1996 is the 13th edition of the ABC's junior championship for basketball. The games were held at Bangkok, Thailand from April 21–28, 1996.

Preliminary round

Group A

Group B

Classification 5th–12th

11th place

9th place

7th place

5th place

Final round

Semifinals

3rd place

Final

Final standing

Awards

References
FIBA Archive

1996
1996 in women's basketball
1995–96 in Asian basketball
1996 in Thai sport
International women's basketball competitions hosted by Thailand
1996 in youth sport
April 1996 sports events in Asia